This is a list of school districts in Maryland.

Allegany County Public Schools
Anne Arundel County Public Schools
Baltimore City Public Schools
Baltimore County Public Schools
Calvert County Public Schools
Caroline County Public Schools
Carroll County Public Schools
Cecil County Public Schools
Charles County Public Schools
Dorchester County Public Schools
Frederick County Public Schools
Garrett County Public Schools
Harford County Public Schools
Howard County Public Schools
Kent County Public Schools
Montgomery County Public Schools
Prince George's County Public Schools
Queen Anne's County Public Schools
Saint Mary's County Public Schools
Somerset County Public Schools
Talbot County Public Schools
Washington County Public Schools
Wicomico County Public Schools
Worcester County Public Schools

See also
List of high schools in Maryland

School districts
Maryland
School districts